Walid Yusuf Taha (born 7 September 1968) is an Israeli Arab politician. He is currently a member of the Knesset for the United Arab List.

Biography
Born in Kafr Qasim, Taha gained a bachelor's degree in political science from the Open University, a bachelor's degree in history at Tel Aviv University, and a master's degree in political science at Tel Aviv University. He worked in education in Ramla as the principal of Al Huda School.

A member of the Islamic Movement, Taha became the chair of the organisation's Kafr Qasim branch. He was elected to the city council, becoming director of education. He ran in the United Arab List primary elections prior to the 2015 Knesset elections, attempting to gain second place on the party's list, but lost to Abd al-Hakim Hajj Yahya by one vote. However, he was placed sixth on the Joint List (an alliance of the four main Arab parties) for the September 2019 Knesset elections, and was elected to the Knesset as the alliance won thirteen seats.

The United Arab List ran independently in the 2021 elections, with Taha re-elected as the party won four seats.

References

External links

1968 births
Living people
Arab members of the Knesset
Israeli educators
Israeli Muslims
Joint List politicians
Members of the 22nd Knesset (2019–2020)
Members of the 23rd Knesset (2020–2021)
Members of the 24th Knesset (2021–2022)
Members of the 25th Knesset (2022–)
Open University of Israel alumni
People from Kafr Qasim
Tel Aviv University alumni
United Arab List politicians